Tinissa chalcites is a moth of the family Tineidae. It was described by Robinson in 1976. It is found in New Guinea.

References

Moths described in 1976
Scardiinae